Sclerotinia borealis or snow scald is a psychrophilic plant pathogen infecting barley, rye and wheat.

Physiology

Temperature
Minimum growth temperature is below . Maximum growth temperature , whereupon irregular mycelial growth occurs and oxygen consumption is far above healthy level; does not survive above. Frost is necessary during life cycle.

Enzymes
A crude extract of cultured bran contained a particular low mass molecule which maintained activity at low temperature.

Antifreeze proteins
Necessitated by its lifestyle, S. borealis produces its own antifreeze proteins. One of these is homologous to Atlantic winter flounder type I antifreeze protein. Extracellular presence of its AFPs is not necessary.

Life cycle
Upon the spring snowmelt, wet leaves develop S. borealis growth. Sclerotia and mycelia grow on sheaths, crowns, surfaces, and interiors of leaves. Has dramatically more growth - and damage to its hosts - in growth seasons following winters with greater depth of soil freezing but less snow cover. S. borealis is very soil-frost-dependent.

Morphology

Mycelia gray.

Hosts
Grasses and trees. Economically significant grasses include winter cereals and forages. Conifer seedlings in the Volga-Ural region of Russia.

Distribution
S. borealis is found in cool temperate areas, frigid zone areas, and into the Arctic, including northern Japan, Russia, northern Scandinavia, and North America. Specifically including Arctic areas of Alaska, the Yukon, Greenland, Finnmark county in Norway, Finnish Lapland, Swedish Lapland, Svalbard. It was unexpectedly not found in the similar climate of Iceland. Southernmost limit is Iwate, northern Japan, the Altai Mountains in central Siberia, and possibly the Xinjiang Province of China. Not found in any temperate region which also receives snowfall, except Japan.

Laboratory culture
Lab culture must simulate the freezing cycle of the natural range. Can grow on relatively low water potato dextrose agar if twice the normal PDA concentration, sucrose, KCl, and -mannitol. Higher mycelial growth and lower optimal mycelial growth temp (to ) if increased intracellular osmosis. Able to utilize nutrients from partially thawed low-water PDA. These may be the/one of the reasons for irregular growth, progressing to lethality, at these higher temperatures.

References

External links 
 Index Fungorum
 USDA ARS Fungal Database

Fungal plant pathogens and diseases
Barley diseases
Rye diseases
Wheat diseases
Sclerotiniaceae
Fungi described in 1917